A trap is a mechanical device used to capture or restrain an animal for purposes such as hunting, pest control, or ecological research.

Trap or TRAP  may also refer to:

Art and entertainment

Films and television 
 Trap (2015 film), Filipino film
 Traps (1994 film), Australian film by Pauline Chan
 A Trap (1997), Polish film
 Trap (TV series), a 2019 South Korean television series
 Traps (TV series), a 1994 American police family drama

Music 
 Trap music, a subgenre of hip hop that originated in the 1990s in the Southeastern United States
 Trap music (EDM), a subgenre of electronic dance music that originated in the 2010s
 Trap (EP), debut by Henry, 2013
 Trap (Dead Man Ray album), 2000
 "Trap" (Shakira song) (feat. Maluma), 2018
"Trap", a song by Elizaveta from Messenger
"The Trap", a song from Playland by Johnny Marr
"The Trap", a song from Good & Evil by Tally Hall
 Traps (album), 2012 by Jaill
 "Traps", a single from the Bloc Party album Alpha Games, 2021
 Traps, a stage name used by the drummer Buddy Rich

Other uses in art and entertainment 
 Trap (novel), by Peter Mathers, 1966
 Claptrap, a fictional character from Borderlands
 Trap room, a part of a theatre
 Treasury Relief Art Project (1935–39), a New Deal art project

Biology and medicine 

 Trapezius, a muscle

 Tartrate-resistant acid phosphatase, a metalloenzyme involved in bone formation
 Mediator (coactivator) or thyroid hormone receptor-associated proteins
 TNF-related activation protein, also known as CD40 ligand
 Tripartite ATP-independent periplasmic transporter, in prokaryotes
 trp RNA-binding attenuation protein, in bacilli
 US TRAP laws ("Targeted Regulation of Abortion Providers")
 TNF receptor associated periodic syndrome (TRAPS)
 Twin reversed arterial perfusion, a twin pregnancy abnormality

Games 
 Trap (chess)
 Trap (poker), a strategy
 Trap pass, see Glossary of contract bridge terms

Places 
 Tarap, Attock, a village in Pakistan
 Trap, Mogila, a village in North Macedonia
 Trap, Carmarthenshire, a hamlet in Wales, United Kingdom
 Trap Grounds, a nature reserve in Oxford, England, United Kingdom

Science and technology 
 Chemical trap, a chemical compound that is used to detect unstable compounds
 Magnetic trap, the use of magnetic fields to isolate atoms or particles
 Petroleum trap, a geological structure that forms a petroleum reservoir
 Social trap. a psychological system where people, operating for short-term individual gains, lead to long-term group losses.
 Trap rock, any dark-colored, fine-grained, non-granitic igneous rock
 Trap and trace device, records any number called by, or calling, a particular telephone
 Trap (plumbing), a pipe to prevent the release of gases
 Trap (printing), a commercial-printing technique to overcome registration problem

Computing 
 Interrupt, a request for the processor to interrupt executing code
 A type of Simple Network Management Protocol Protocol Data Unit used to report an alert or other asynchronous event about a managed subsystem
 Intercepting normal method calls via a proxy object

Sports 
 Neutral zone trap, an ice hockey defensive strategy
 Sand trap, a type of bunker (golf)
 Starting Traps, the equipment that racing greyhounds start a race from
 Trap shooting
 Triathlon Association of the Philippines, the governing body for the sport in the Philippines

Transportation 
 Trap (car), a secret compartment in an automobile
 Trap (carriage), a type of horse-drawn carriage
 Traffic-related air pollution

Other uses 
 Trapdoor
 Operation Trap, code name of a large-scale Soviet offensive operation against the Mujahideen supply base of Karkari-Sharshari
 Tactical Recovery of Aircraft and Personnel, a U.S. military term for a rescue mission to retrieve a downed aircraft
 "Trap", a derogatory slur for a transgender woman

See also 
 Ambush
 Booby trap
 Sand trap (disambiguation)
 The Trap (disambiguation)
 Trapped (disambiguation)
 Trapper (disambiguation)